From the House of Arts is a live album by chamber progressive band iamthemorning. The album is a live recording of the House of Arts performance of Belighted, recorded on 31 October 2014. The album was funded through Kickstarter and released on 23 October 2015.

Track listing
 All songs written and produced by iamthemorning.

Personnel
iamthemorning
 Gleb Kolyadin - grand piano, keyboards 
 Marjana Semkina - vocals, backing vocals

Additional musicians
 Vlad Avy - guitar 
 Anton Glushkin - acoustic guitar 
 Max Roudenko - bass 
 Mikhail Istratov - drums 
 Philipp Saulin - violin 
 Mikhail Ignatov – cello

Production
 Vlad Avy – mixing
 Constantine Nagishkin – artwork
 Marcel van Limbeek – engineering
 Anna Pavluk – engineering

References

2015 live albums
Iamthemorning albums
Self-released albums